Pankey is a formerly unincorporated community in Pulaski County, Arkansas, United States on Arkansas Highway 10. Historically, it was located west of Little Rock, but has since been annexed by the city.

References 

Neighborhoods in Little Rock, Arkansas